John C. Tilley (August 1854 – March 6, 1927) was an American left fielder in professional baseball. He played in Major League Baseball for the 1882 Cleveland Blues of the National League, the 1884 Toledo Blue Stockings of the American Association, and the 1884 St. Paul White Caps of the Union Association.

External links

1854 births
1927 deaths
19th-century baseball players
Major League Baseball left fielders
Cleveland Blues (NL) players
Toledo Blue Stockings players
St. Paul Saints (UA) players
Alaskas players
New York New Yorks players
New York Quicksteps players
Toledo Blue Stockings (minor league) players
St. Paul Apostles players
Baseball players from New York (state)